is a town located in Saitama Prefecture, Japan. , the town had an estimated population of 38,101 in 16,692 households and a population density of 2500 persons per km².

Geography
Miyoshi is located in south-central Saitama Prefecture.

Surrounding municipalities
Saitama Prefecture
 Fujimi
 Tokorozawa
 Kawagoe
 Shiki
 Niiza
 Fujimino

Climate
Miyoshi has a humid subtropical climate (Köppen Cfa) characterized by warm summers and cool winters with light to no snowfall.  The average annual temperature in Miyoshi is 14.0 °C. The average annual rainfall is 1647 mm with September as the wettest month. The temperatures are highest on average in August, at around 25.7 °C, and lowest in January, at around 2.3 °C.

Demographics
Per Japanese census data, the population of Miyoshi saw strong growth starting around 1960 which leveled off around 1990.

History
The place name of "Miyoshin-no-sato" appears in the Heian period Ise Monogatari, and was part of ancient Musashi Province.  During the Edo period, it was part of the holdings of Kawagoe Domain and was a rural agricultural area with few inhabitants. The village of Miyoshi was created within Iruma District, Saitama on April 1, 1889 with the establishment of the modern municipalities system. It was elevated to town status on November 3, 1970.

Government
Miyoshi has a mayor-council form of government with a directly elected mayor and a unicameral town council of 15 members. Miyoshi, together with the city of Fujimino, contributes two members to the Saitama Prefectural Assembly. In terms of national politics, the town is part of Saitama 8th district of the lower house of the Diet of Japan.

Economy
The economy of Miyoshi is largely agricultural, with sweet potatoes a major crop. However, the town is also a bedroom community with some 25% of its working population commuting to nearby Tokyo.

Education
Miyoshi has five public elementary schools and three public middle schools operated by the town government. The town does not have a high school. Chiba-based Shukutoku University has a campus in Miyoshi.

Transportation

Railway
Miyoshi is not served by any passenger rail service.

Highway

Sister city relations
 Petaling Jaya, Malaysia

Noted people from Miyoshi
Hitomi Yoshizawa, musician

References

External links

Official Website 

Towns in Saitama Prefecture
Miyoshi, Saitama